Kington railway station was a station in Kington, Herefordshire, England. Replacing an earlier terminus station which had been opened in 1857, the station was opened in 1875 and closed in 1964. The final passenger service had been on 5 February 1955, and passenger services were withdrawn two days later.

The 1857 station building can still be seen on what is now the Hatton Gardens Industrial Estate. 

A model of the station, as it appeared in the mid-1940s, may be viewed at the nearby Kington Museum.

References

Sources

Further reading

Disused railway stations in Herefordshire
Railway stations in Great Britain opened in 1857
Railway stations in Great Britain opened in 1875
Railway stations in Great Britain closed in 1955
Former Great Western Railway stations
Kington, Herefordshire